Kostis Kornetis (born 1975) is a historian of twentieth-century Europe.

Works

References

1975 births
Living people
Historians of modern Greece
Contemporary historians
European University Institute alumni